Jaroslav Vykoupil (2 February 1898 – 21 October 1976) was a Czech sprinter. He competed in the men's 100 metres at the 1928 Summer Olympics.

References

1898 births
1976 deaths
Athletes (track and field) at the 1928 Summer Olympics
Czech male sprinters
Olympic athletes of Czechoslovakia
Place of birth missing